The Olympic Bell was commissioned and cast for the 2012 London Olympic Games, and is the largest harmonically-tuned bell in the world. The bell is now displayed in the Olympic Park.

Making the bell

In September 2011 the Whitechapel Bell Foundry, a few miles from the London Stadium (which hosted the track and field elements of the games, as well as the Olympic Opening Ceremony), was commissioned to make the bell. The Foundry completed its design, profile, lettering and tuning. There was some controversy over using a non-British firm, as Taylor’s Bell Foundry in Loughborough had also tendered to cast the bell. The hammer mechanism and hanging framework were made by other firms and twenty companies in three countries were eventually involved with its production. The bell was installed and tested in the stadium at midnight on 1 June 2012. It was designed to be as large as possible but needed to fit through the athletes’ tunnel; when it arrived there were only a few inches to spare.

The bell is the second heaviest in Europe, after St Petersglocke in Cologne Cathedral and the largest harmonically tuned bell in the world. Its main note (in campanology, its 'hum tone') is B.

The bell is inscribed with "London 2012" and a line from Caliban's speech in The Tempest: "Be not afeard, the isle is full of noises", which featured in the Olympics opening ceremony spoken by Kenneth Branagh. The other side bears the legend "Whitechapel" and the Foundry's coat of arms.

Ringing the bell

Bradley Wiggins, who had won the Tour de France five days earlier, opened the ceremony by 'ringing' the bell.  This was symbolic as the hammer was actually moved mechanically: one journalist noted "He may be a superhuman athlete but even Bradley Wiggins isn’t capable of setting the Olympic Bell’s monumental half-ton clapper in motion by hand!" The bell was also rung later in the ceremony, including just before Paul McCartney's performance of "Hey Jude". McCartney blamed his faltering start on the unexpected loud sound of the bell, as he had forgotten it was going to be rung.

The bell also featured in music within the ceremony, such as in "And I Will Kiss". The bell was recorded at night, in the rain during rehearsals; sound engineers had to ask for work to stop for half an hour to successfully record it.

The bell hung in the Olympic Stadium for the opening ceremony.  It was then moved to make way for the Olympic cauldron, and stored in the Olympic Park.  The Olympic Park re-opened in July 2013, and in May 2016 the bell was returned and reinstalled on a supporting structure just outside the Olympic Stadium. The Olympic opening ceremony programme pledged that after 200 years the bell would return to the Whitechapel Bell Foundry for retuning, but the foundry closed in 2017.

The bell is not currently rung due to concerns that doing so would disturb nearby residents, making it possibly the largest ornamental bell in the world.

See also
Olympic Bell for the 1936 Berlin Summer Olympics

References

External links
 
 
 

Individual bells
2012 Summer Olympics